Muhammad ibn Yahya Sibak Nishapuri, commonly known as Fattahi Nishapuri ("Fattahi" was his pen name; died 1448), was a Persian poet and calligrapher in the Timurid Empire. A native of the city of Nishapur, he was one of the leading poets and calligraphers at the court of the Timurid ruler Shah Rukh.

References

Sources 
 
 

Poets from the Timurid Empire
15th-century Iranian people
Year of birth unknown
1448 deaths
People from Nishapur